The Cook Islands competed in the 2014 Commonwealth Games in Glasgow, Scotland from 23 July to 3 August 2014. The country participated in the Commonwealth Games for the tenth time, and has never previously won a medal.

Athletics

Men
Track & road events

Women
Track & road events

Lawn bowls

Men

Women

Rugby sevens

Cook Islands has qualified a rugby sevens team.

Roster

 Harry Berryman
 Ashley Drake
 Sean Fletcher
 James Iopu
 Junior Kiria
 Koiatu Koiatu
 Simon Marcel
 Gregory Mullany
 Teu Paerau
 Josh Petero
 James Raea
 Twoboys Taia

Bowl Quarterfinals

Bowl Semifinals

Bowl Finals

Weightlifting

Women

References

Nations at the 2014 Commonwealth Games
Cook Islands at the Commonwealth Games
2014 in Cook Islands sport